Bairiya Birta is a village development committee in Parsa District in the Narayani Zone of southern Nepal. At the time of the 2011 Nepal census it had a population of 5,213 people living in 800 individual households. There were 2,638 males and 2,575 females at the time of Nepal.

References

Populated places in Parsa District